was a joint-venture between Electronic Arts and Victor Entertainment. They made sports games for the Family Computer, Super Famicom, and the Mega Drive. This brand name is unknown outside Japan and the emulation community (since the brand only appears on the game's cover and/or in the media). Some concepts include J-League association football, American football, and NHL hockey.

In December 1997, Electronic Arts acquired Victor's 35% stake in the venture, and in May 1998 signed a similar joint-venture deal with Square to publish EA titles in Japan, called Electronic Arts Square.

Games developed / published 
 Battle Garegga
 Cotton: Fantastic Night Dreams
 Warcraft II: Tides of Darkness
 Little Big Adventure
 Fade to Black
 Alone in the Dark 2
 NHL Pro Hockey '94
 F-117 Night Storm
 J-League Winning Goal (J-Rīgu Uiningu Gōru - Jリーグ ウィニングゴール)
 Zico Soccer
 Mutant League Football
 Soukyugurentai
 Ultima Underworld
 Tactical Soccer
 J. League Live 64
 Deadlock: Planetary Conquest (Deddorokku - デッドロック)
 NASCAR 98 (PlayStation)
 Metal Fist
 FIFA World Cup 98: France Sōshūhen (PlayStation)
 Super Zugan: Hakotenjou kara no Shoutai
 NBA Live 2000 (PlayStation)
 Championship Bass (PlayStation)

References 

Electronic Arts
Defunct video game companies of Japan
Video game companies disestablished in 1998
Victor Entertainment